Gummidipoondi taluk is a taluk of Tiruvallur district of the Indian state of Tamil Nadu. The headquarters of the taluk is the town of Gummidipoondi.

Demographics
According to the 2011 census, the taluk of Gummidipoondi had a population of 190,548 with 95,833 males and 94,715 females. There were 988 women for every 1,000 men. The taluk had a literacy rate of 64.49%. The child population in the age group below 6 years consisted of 10,232 males and 9,986 females.

References 

Taluks of Tiruvallur district